František Marek (26 November 1899 – 18 July 1971) was a Czech architect. His work was part of the architecture event in the art competition at the 1948 Summer Olympics.

References

1899 births
1971 deaths
20th-century Czech architects
Olympic competitors in art competitions
People from Rychnov nad Kněžnou District